Ciepłe may refer to:

Ciepłe, Masovian Voivodeship, Poland
Ciepłe, Pomeranian Voivodeship, Poland